Gordon Clayton may refer to:

 Gordon Clayton (footballer, born 1936) (1936–1991), English football goalkeeper
 Gordon Clayton (footballer, born 1910) (1910–1976), English football centre forward